Chuang Tsui-yun is a Taiwanese politician. She has served as the Minister of Finance since 31 January 2023.

Education
Chuang obtained her bachelor's degree in land economics from National Chengchi University.

Political career
Chuang previously served as a deputy director of National Property Bureau, a division of the Ministry of Finance. In 2016, she was elevated to political deputy minister of the finance ministry, and in January 2023, was promoted to succeed Su Jain-rong as finance minister.

References

Living people
Taiwanese Ministers of Finance
Female finance ministers
Women government ministers of Taiwan
Year of birth missing (living people)